Annelly is a ghost town in Richland Township 9 miles southeast of Newton in Harvey County, Kansas, United States.  The community was located along the Missouri Pacific Railroad line between Newton and Whitewater, but the track was abandoned in 2003. As of 2020, the land is privately owned farmland.

History

Early history

For many millennia, the Great Plains of North America was inhabited by nomadic Native Americans.  From the 16th century to 18th century, the Kingdom of France claimed ownership of large parts of North America.  In 1762, after the French and Indian War, France secretly ceded New France to Spain, per the Treaty of Fontainebleau.

19th century

In 1802, Spain returned most of the land to France.  In 1803, most of the land for modern day Kansas was acquired by the United States from France as part of the 828,000 square mile Louisiana Purchase for 2.83 cents per acre.

In 1854, the Kansas Territory was organized, then in 1861 Kansas became the 34th U.S. state.  In 1872, Harvey County was established within the Kansas Territory, which included the land for modern day Annelly.

The community was established after the Missouri Pacific was built through the area.  Annelly was named by a railroad employee for his wife Ann and daughter Ellie.  A post office existed in Annelly from August 25, 1885, to December 31, 1921.

20th century
In 1910, Annelly, (population 25) had a money order post office, a station on the Missouri Pacific Railroad, a grain elevator, a hotel, and a general store.

21st century
In 2003, the railroad track was abandoned.

Today only the Main Street (Annelly Road or SE 57th Street, accessible from S East Lake Rd. and SE 60th Street) of Annelly still exists. Until the early 2010s an old one-room school house stood near the townsite, although the schoolhouse could not be observed or approached from public roads. The school house was moved to property owned by Lewis Earl Entz. It has been restored but is on private property. For many years, even after the school closed this was the community center, for 4H and the Women's Farm Bureau which became the EHU Extension Homemakers Units. It was also where residents of the township voted for many years. 

A farm house on the west end of Main Street is still occupied. The old railroad bed still passes through the townsite, and some evidence of buildings and old streets can still be seen. Gypsum Creek, a tributary of the Whitewater River, runs through Annelly.

Geography
Annelly was located at coordinates 37.9722350, -97.2011463 in the state of Kansas.

Education
The modern day rural area around Annelly is served by the Remington USD 206 public school district.

References

Further reading

External links
 Harvey County Maps: Current, Historic, KDOT
 Annelly Topo Map

Former populated places in Harvey County, Kansas
Ghost towns in Kansas